Ben Kinney is an entrepreneur, professional speaker, author, real estate agent, brokerage owner, and co-founder of PLACE, Inc. that started in Bellingham, Washington and now operates across the USA, Canada, and the U.K .  

He is listed in The Wall Street Journal and REAL Trends' top 1,000 agents for 2011-2022. He was the top ranked agent in Washington state in transactional volume for the years 2012-2021.

Kinney is the founder of Ben Kinney Companies commonly referred to as "BKCO" which owns and operates the sales divisions, brokerages, training companies, and the technology firms including NVNTD, Blueroof360, Activerain, Automabots, Brivity, and Blossor.

In 2013, NVNTD purchased Big Fresh Media and Tech Help.  In 2015 BKCO purchased KWKLY and Activerain from the Zillow Group.  In 2017 BKCO acquired the Salt Lake City technology company Blueroof360 and in August, 2017 they also acquired the San Diego based AI company, Automabots.

In 2019, Kinney along with Chris Suarez co-founded the real estate technology platform, Place.  In 2021 Goldman Sachs along with 3L invested 100 million dollars into Place at over a Billion dollar valuation.

Early life
Kinney was born in Everett, WA on July 24, 1978.  He was the second born child to Dorothy Louise Stine and Michael Byron Kinney.  He was raised in a small cabin without indoor plumbing or power in Oso, Washington between Bellingham, Washington and Seattle, Washington with his father, Mike Kinney who was a fly fishing guide and wildlife photographer. Kinney graduated from Granite Falls High School in 1997 before obtaining a two year associates degree from Everett Community College.   While completing his four year degree at Western Washington University he worked as a cable television installer. He later transitioned into the door to door sales of cable television, telephone and internet services before starting his career in real estate in 2004.

Career
Kinney became a full-time real estate agent in 2004. Kinney later developed the curriculum for an online real estate designation course named IMSD - Internet Marketing Specialist Designation. He sold the curriculum to MarketLeader a publicly traded company acquired by Trulia, but continued to teach classes through the brands Ben Kinney Training, Re8Expo, and Raincamp.

Kinney created two real estate tech startups, Brivity and Blossor. He was named the 2014 Innovator of the Year by Inman News.

On June 19, 2015, Zillow Group Announced the Sale of ActiveRain and KWKLY to the Ben Kinney Companies.

Publications
Kinney co-authored Soci@l, an ebook published by Rellek Publishing Partners, with Jay Papasan. Soci@l won a bronze award at the 2011 National Association of Real Estate Editors competition.

References

Further reading
ComputerSide Chat with RainCamp Presenter Ben Kinney

External links
Official site
Brivity
PLACE

American real estate businesspeople
American male writers
Year of birth missing (living people)
Living people